Péter Nagy (born 11 December 1996) is a Slovak football midfielder who currently plays for 2. liga club FC ŠTK 1914 Šamorín. He is ethnic Hungarian.

Club career

FC DAC 1904 Dunajská Streda
Nagy made his professional Fortuna Liga debut for FC DAC 1904 Dunajská Streda against ŠK Slovan Bratislava on 6 August 2016.

References

External links
 FC DAC 1904 Dunajská Streda official club profile
 
 Futbalnet profile

1996 births
Living people
Slovak footballers
Association football midfielders
FC DAC 1904 Dunajská Streda players
KFC Komárno players
FC Petržalka players
FC ŠTK 1914 Šamorín players
Slovak Super Liga players
2. Liga (Slovakia) players
Sportspeople from Dunajská Streda
Hungarians in Slovakia